Bush Pilot is a 1947 Canadian-American film directed by Sterling Campbell. The film, produced by Campbell's Dominion Productions, was noted for being one of the first full-length feature films outside Quebec in which a Canadian production company held the primary role.

Plot summary 
Red North is a bush pilot in the village of Nouvelle, part of Canada's north. His half-brother, Paul Gerard decides to relocate his bush pilot business to the same lake, competing with Red's business and romantic interests.

Cast
 Rochelle Hudson as Hilary Ward
 Jack La Rue as Paul Girard
 Austin Willis as "Red" North
 Florence Kennedy as Mrs. Ward
 Frank Perry as Chuck Ward
 Joseph Carr as Andy Moodie
 Gordon Adam
 Louise Campbell
 Charles Emerson
 Gerald Rowan
 James Peddie
 Denis Murphy
 Michael Lambert
 Robert Christie
 Eric Clavering
 Nancy Graham
 Alene Kamis

Production
The film was one of the first narrative feature films produced in English by a Canadian film production company. The company was Dominion Productions Limited. Director Sterling Campbell was a partner in the company along with the film's producer Larry Cromien and star, Austin Willis and Geoffrey Wood. The main backer was Wood, founder of G. H. Wood & Co., a sanitation supply company that bore the motto "Sanitation for the Nation." He invested $160,000 in the film.

Bush Pilot was meant to be the first of six films.
 
The movie was one of the first features to be shot in Toronto with studio work done at Queensway Studios. Outdoor and flight sequences filmed in the Muskoka region of Ontario, particularly Lake Rosseau.

Reception
Although J. Arthur Rank owned Queensway Studios, he did not pick up the film for distribution in his cinema chains.

The movie was not a box office success and Dominion films never made another film.

""I got pretty enthusiastic about all that film nonsense", Wood recalled in 1987. "But I didn't know what was going on. I knew as much about the movies as those movie people knew about sanitation."

Restoration 
Wood deposited a nitrate negative of the film with the National Archives in 1972.

Although long out of print, the film was restored by the National Archives of Canada and The Movie Network in the 1990s, and was screened on the Movie Network as a special Canada Day broadcast in 1998.

According to the Globe and Mail, "despite the hoary stereotypes and predictable plot, Bush Pilot was, to its credit, far ahead of its time in its unashamed use of specifically Canadian references."

The Toronto Star called it "a camp curio today, an unintended hoot.",

References

External links 

Bush Pilot at BFI

Bush Pilot at Northern Stars

1947 films
1947 adventure films
1940s English-language films
American black-and-white films
Canadian black-and-white films
American aviation films
Canadian aviation films
Canadian adventure films
English-language Canadian films
Films shot in Toronto
Lippert Pictures films
1940s American films
1940s Canadian films